The 2007–08 Hellenic Football League season was the 55th in the history of the Hellenic Football League, a football competition in England.

Premier Division

Premier Division featured 18 clubs which competed in the division last season, along with four new clubs:
Badshot Lea, promoted from Division One East
Flackwell Heath, relegated from the Isthmian League
Hook Norton, promoted from Division One West
Lydney Town, promoted from Division One West

League table

Division One East

Division One East featured 15 clubs which competed in the division last season, along with two clubs:
Ascot United, joined from the Reading Football League
Thame United, relegated from the Premier Division

League table

Division One West

Division One West featured 15 clubs which competed in the division last season, along with three new clubs:
Headington Amateurs, transferred from Division One East
Launton Sports, joined from the Oxfordshire Senior League
Oxford Quarry Nomads, transferred from Division One East and changed name to Oxford City Nomads

League table

References

External links
 Hellenic Football League

2007-08
9